Shareholder primacy is a theory in corporate governance—especially when dealing with United States corporate law—holding that shareholder interests should be assigned first priority relative to all other corporate stakeholders. A shareholder primacy approach often gives shareholders power to intercede directly and frequently in corporate decision-making, through such means as unilateral shareholder power to amend corporate charters, shareholder referendums on business decisions and regular corporate board election contests. The shareholder primacy norm was first used by courts to resolve disputes among majority and minority shareholders, and, over time, this use of the shareholder primacy norm evolved into the modern doctrine of minority shareholder oppression.

James Kee wrote in 1995 for the Mises Institute, "If private property were truly respected, shareholder interest would be the primary, or even better, the sole purpose, of the corporation." However, the doctrine of shareholder primacy has been criticized for being at odds with corporate social responsibility and other legal obligations.

Background
In their 1932 publication on foundations of United States corporate law and governance—The Modern Corporation and Private Property—Adolf Berle and Gardiner Means's first introduced the idea that "shareholders are the corporation's 'true owners'."

In his landmark book, Capitalism and Freedom, the economist Milton Friedman, advanced the theory of shareholder primacy which says that "corporations have no higher purpose than maximizing profits for their shareholders." Friedman said that if corporations were to accept anything but making money for their stockholders as their primary purpose, it would "thoroughly undermine the very foundation of our free society." His article, "A Friedman Doctrine: The Social Responsibility of Business is to Increase Its Profits", was published September 13, 1970 in The New York Times.

See also
 Friedman doctrine

References

Corporate governance
Primacy